Orophia thesmophila is a species of moth in the family Depressariidae. It was described by Edward Meyrick in 1930, and is known from Mauritius.

References
Meyrick, E. (1930). "Microlepidoptera of Mauritius". Transactions of the Entomological Society of London. 78 (2): 309–323.

Moths described in 1930
Orophia